"The Stars That Play with Laughing Sam's Dice", also known as "STP with LSD" and various related abbreviations and shortenings, is a song by English-American psychedelic rock band The Jimi Hendrix Experience, featured as the B-side to their 1967 fourth single "Burning of the Midnight Lamp". Written by vocalist and guitarist Jimi Hendrix, the song was later featured on the UK Version of the 1968 compilation album Smash Hits and the posthumous Loose Ends and South Saturn Delta compilations.

Recording
"The Stars That Play..." was first recorded by The Experience at Houston Studios in Los Angeles, California in late June 1967, with a number of demos taped between June 28 and 30. With the recording of "...Midnight Lamp" taking place throughout July, with the single completed by July 20, the B-side was also completed at the same time, with the basic track recorded on July 19 and additional overdubs and mixing taking place on July 29. The track features a largely unidentified group of people referred to as "The Milky Way Express" providing backing vocals, whistles and other sounds, which is said to include musician Frank Zappa. The song was also the first recording released by Hendrix to feature his subsequently characteristic wah-wah sound.

Background and release
According to Jimi Hendrix: Electric Gypsy, "...Laughing Sam's Dice" was "hardly commented upon at the time [of the release of "The Burning of the Midnight Lamp" single] – dismissed as a good-time joke with lots of guitar to fill up the B-side." Due to its title, it has been suggested in later years that the song is a reference to (and possibly even influenced by) the hallucinogenics STP ("Stars That Play") and LSD ("Laughing Sam's Dice"), which were also said to be significant in the development of psychedelic music. Further on the background of the song, the following has been proposed:

"The Stars..." has also been compared to "Spanish Castle Magic" and "Have You Ever Been (To Electric Ladyland)", as a song which embodies a "magical mystery tour spirit." The song was originally released as the B-side to the "Burning of the Midnight Lamp" single, released in the United Kingdom and some parts of Europe on August 19, 1967, which reached number 18 on the UK Singles Chart. The song was later featured on the international (non-North America) edition of the  Smash Hits compilation released in April 1968, and posthumously on the 1974 Loose Ends and 1997 South Saturn Delta albums, and the 2000 The Jimi Hendrix Experience box set.

References

Sources

Stars That Play with Laughing Sam's Dice, The
Stars That Play with Laughing Sam's Dice, The
Stars That Play with Laughing Sam's Dice, The
Song recordings produced by Chas Chandler
Songs about drugs